The United States was the host nation for the 1932 Summer Olympics in Los Angeles, California. 474 competitors, 400 men and 74 women, took part in 122 events in 17 sports.

Medalists

Athletics

Men
Track & road events

 Bob Tisdall from Ireland won the gold medal in the 400 metres hurdles event, but Tisdall's time was rejected as a world record as he knocked over the last hurdle, as per the rules of the time; Hardin was therefore credited as world record holder.

Field events

Combined events – Decathlon

Women
Track & road events

Field events

Boxing

Cycling

Road

Track
Sprint

Pursuit

Diving

Men

Women

Equestrian

Dressage

Eventing

Jumping
The team event was declared void as no nation completed the course with three riders.

Fencing

Men

Women

Field hockey

William Boddington
Harold Brewster (GK)
Roy Coffin
Amos Deacon
Horace Disston
Samuel Ewing
James Gentle
Henry Greer
Lawrence Knapp
David McMullin
Leonard O'Brien
Charles Sheaffer
Frederick Wolters
Warren Ingersoll

Gymnastics

Artistic
For the team event, the four best total individual scores determined the team's final score. To calculate total individual scores, results from all events with the exception of the pommel horse were added and divided by two, with the quotient added to the pommel horse score. Individual scores still counted for the individual all-around competition.

Team

Individual
Apparatus and all-around events received separate scores.

Indian clubs

Rope climbing

Tumbling

Modern pentathlon

Rowing

Sailing

Shooting

Swimming

Men

Women

Water polo

Head coach: Frank Rivas

Results

Weightlifting

Wrestling

Freestyle

Wrestlers who accumulated 5 "bad points" were eliminated. Points were given as follows: 1 point for victories short of a fall and 3 points for every loss.

Art competitions

References

Nations at the 1932 Summer Olympics
1932
Oly
1932 in California
1932 in sports in California